The Skull of Pharaoh's Daughter (German: Der Schädel der Pharaonentochter) is a 1920 German silent film directed by Otz Tollen and starring Emil Jannings, Erna Morena and Kurt Vespermann.

The film's sets were designed by the art director Fritz Kraenke.

Cast

References

Bibliography
 Herman G. Weinberg. The Lubitsch touch: a critical study. Dover Publications, 1977.

External links

1920 films
Films of the Weimar Republic
Films directed by Otz Tollen
German silent feature films
German black-and-white films
German anthology films
Films set in ancient Egypt